The Szilágyi of Horogszeg was an important Hungarian noble family of the Kingdom of Hungary and of Transylvania.

History
The Szilágyi family comes from the region of the Szilágy-patak (present-day Sălaj River, part of Romania).

Most specialist agree that the family died out in the Middle Ages. Zoltán W. Vityi says that the noble Szilágyis of Horogszeg who lived in Nyírgelse and Nyírmihálydi (in Szabolcs County in Hungary) in the 1930s were descended from the medieval noble family.

Notable members

Ladislaus Szilágyi (15th century) of Horogszeg, captain of the fortress of Bradics
Michael Szilágyi (1400–1460), Regent of the Kingdom of Hungary, Voivode of Transylvania, Ban of Macsó
Jusztina Szilágyi, Second consort Vlad Tepes III
Erzsébet Szilágyi, Queen Mother of Hungary, mother of king Matthias Corvinus
Orsolya Szilágyi, wife of John Rozgonyi, voivode of Transylvania, Judge Royal of the Kingdom of Hungary
Zsófia Szilágyi was the wife of John Geréb de Vingárt, vice-voivode of Transylvania
Margit (Erzsébet) Szilágyi, wife of Máté (Mátyus) Maróti, Ban de Macsó, Ispán of Bács, Baranya, Bodrog, Syrmia, Tolna and Valkó Counties

See also
Szilágyi – Hunyadi Liga
List of titled noble families in the Kingdom of Hungary

References

Sources
Bokor József (szerk.). A Pallas nagy lexikona. Arcanum: FolioNET Kft. , 1998
Radu R. Florescu, Raymond T. McNally, Dracula: Prince of many faces - His life and his times, p. 130
Kisfaludy Károly: Szilágyi Mihály szabadulása (színmű, Pest, 1822)
Fraknói Vilmos: Michael Szilágyi, The uncle of King Matthias (Bp., 1913)

External links 
College of the Hereditary Nobility of Hungary and Transylvania
 For a list of surnames of the historical nobility of Hungary, see nobilitashungariae: List of Historical Surnames of the Hungarian Nobility / nobilitashungariae. A magyar történelmi nemesség családneveinek listájanobilitashungariae: List of Historical Surnames of the Hungarian Nobility
The house of Matthias Corvinus, the only king born in Cluj, 9 March 2015